Veeramachineni Madhusudhana Rao (27 July 1917 – 11 January 2012) was an Indian film director, producer, and screenwriter, known for his works predominantly in Telugu cinema. He is popularly known as ‘Victory’ Madhusudhana Rao. He directed nearly 70 films, including musical hits such as Annapurna (1960), Aradhana (1962), Aathma Balam (1964), Zamindar (1965), Antastulu (1965), Aatmiyulu (1969), Krishnaveni (1974) and produced Swati Kiranam (1992). In 1965 he received the National Film Award for directing Antastulu. Madhusudhan Rao died on 11 January 2012 at the age of 94.

Awards 
National Film Award
National Film Award for Best Feature Film in Telugu - Antastulu - 1967

Nandi Awards
Raghupathi Venkaiah Award for Lifetime Achievement - 1997

Nandi Award for Best Feature Film
Gudi Gantalu (1964)
Antastulu (1965)
Aastiparulu (1966)
Aatmiyulu (1969)
Praja Nayakudu (1972)
Kanchana Ganga (1984)

Nandi Award for Akkineni Award for Best Home-viewing Feature Film - 1991
 Swathi Kiranam

Filmography

Director 

Telugu
 Sati Tulasi (1959)
 Annapurna (1960)
 Taxi Ramudu (1961)
 Padandi Munduku (1962)
 Rakta Sambandham (1962)
 Appagintalu (1962)
 Aradhana (1962)
 Lakshadhikari (1963)
 Aathma Balam (1964)
 Gudi Gantalu (1964)
 Zamindar (1965)
 Antastulu (1965)
 Veerabhimanyu (1965)
 Aastiparulu (1966)
 Dr. Anand (1966)
 Manchi Kutumbam (1968)
 Lakshmi Nivasam (1968)
 Adrushtavanthulu (1969)
 Aatmiyulu (1969)
 Manushulu Marali (1969)
 Pavitra Bandham (1971)
 Amaayakuraalu (1971)
 Kalyana Mandapam (1971)
 Praja Nayakudu (1972)
 Manchi Rojulu Vachchaayi (1972)
 Kanna Koduku (1973)
 Bhakta Tukaram (1973)
 Manchivadu (1973)
 Krishnaveni (1974)
 Premalu Pellillu (1974)
 Chakravakam (1974)
 Jebu Donga (1975)
 Poruginti Pulla Koora (1976)
 Iddaroo Iddare (1976)
 Chakradhari (1977)
 Raja Ramesh (1977)
 Judge Gaari Kodalu (1977)
 Ee Taram Manishi (1977)
 Edureeta (1977)
 Vichitra Jeevitham (1978)
 Angadi Bomma (1978)
 Mallepoovu (1978)
 Joodagaadu (1979)
 Sivamettina Satyam (1979)
 Andaman Ammayi (1979)
 Bebbuli (1980)
 Chandipriya (1980)
 Superman (1980)
 Moogaku Maatoste (1980)
 Samsaram Santanam (1981)
 Jeevita Ratham (1981)
 Puli Bidda (1981)
 Jagamondi (1981)
 Bangaru Kanuka (1982)
 Kasi Yatra (1983)
 Kanchana Ganga (1984)
 Vikram (1986)
 Samrat (1987)
 Prana Snehithulu (1988)
 Aatma Katha (1988)
 Simha Swapnam (1989)
 Pape Maa Pranam (1989)
 Krishna Gari Abbayi (1989)

Kannada
 Sneha Sedu (1978)
 Ondu Hennu Aaru Kannu (1980)

Hindi
 Devi (1970)
 Samaj Ko Badal Dalo (1970)
 Saas Bhi Kabhi Bahu Thi (1970)
 Lav Kush (1997)

Assistant director 
 Thodi Kodallu (1957)

See also 
 Raghupathi Venkaiah Award

References

External links 
 

1917 births
2012 deaths
Telugu film directors
Kannada film directors
Hindi-language film directors
20th-century Indian film directors
People from Krishna district
Film directors from Andhra Pradesh
Screenwriters from Andhra Pradesh